The Centre for Infectious Disease Research in Zambia (CIDRZ) is a non-profit organisation founded in 2001 as collaboration between the University of Alabama at Birmingham, USA, the Ministry of Health of Zambia and the University of Zambia School of Medicine. In 2011 CIDRZ became an independent, Zambian, non-governmental organisation able to collaborate with multiple local and international universities.

Overview 
CIDRZ is one of Zambia's largest health research NGOs employing almost 1000  Zambians who support Ministry of Health services in Lusaka, Western, Eastern and Southern provinces.

CIDRZ is an active partner of, and aims to be a permanent resource to, the Government of the Republic of Zambia and collaborates with the Ministry of Health and many other line ministries. The bulk of CIDRZ's work is funded by competitive grants awarded by the U.S. government through the U.S. President's Emergency Plan for AIDS Relief (PEPFAR)/the Centers for Disease Control and Prevention (CDC) or the National Institutes of Health (NIH) research networks. Other significant support has been provided by USAID, WHO, the European Union, AERAS,  Pink Ribbon Red Ribbon, the Doris Duke Charitable Foundation, Absolute Return for Kids, the Max M. and Marjorie S. Fisher Foundation, the Bill & Melinda Gates Foundation, Comic Relief, MAC AIDS Fund, 3iE, and Mary Fisher among many others. The CIDRZ stated Vision is 'A Zambia and a region in which all people have access to quality healthcare and enjoy the best possible health, including a life free of AIDS. The CIDRZ Mission statement is 'To improve access to quality healthcare in Zambia through innovative capacity development, exceptional implementation science and research, and impactful and sustainable public health programmes.' This reflects the three dimensions that define the purpose of the CIDRZ: (1) research, (2) healthcare service programming and technical assistance, and (3) training. The focus areas of the bulk of CIDRZ programmes are: HIV/AIDS, Tuberculosis, Hepatitis, Diarrhoeal disease, Women, Newborn, Child and Adolescent Health; Water, Sanitation and Hygiene, and Health Systems Strengthening. CIDRZ is also a Clinical Trials Unit for the U.S. National Institutes of Health multi-center, international research networks, the HIV Vaccine Trials Network (HVTN) and the International Maternal Pediatric Adolescent AIDS Clinical Trials Network (IMPAACT).

Leadership 
In early 2013 the leadership of CIDRZ changed to CEO Dr Charles Holmes MD, MPH and Deputy CEO Dr Izukanji Sikazwe MBChB, MPH and the organisation released a revised strategic plan and recruited a new board of directors. At the end of 2016 in a planned transition, Dr Izukanji Sikazwe became the CEO.

References

External links 
 Official Website
 List of Publications

HIV/AIDS research organisations
Medical and health organisations based in Zambia